Linus Fröberg (born June 16, 1993) is a Swedish professional ice hockey player, currently playing for Luleå HF in the Swedish Hockey League (SHL).

Playing career
Fröberg made his professional debut in the Elitserien as a junior with Brynäs IF during the 2010–11 season. While with second SHL club, Färjestad BK, Fröberg was loaned to Mora IK of the HockeyAllsvenskan during the 2011–12 season.

Fröberg played four seasons with the Växjö Lakers, leaving following the 2018–19 campaign as a free agent. On 4 June 2019, Fröberg agreed to a two-year contract with HV71.

Following HV71 relegation to the HockeyAllsvenskan, Fröberg left the club to remain in the SHL with Luleå HF on a two-year contract on 5 July 2021.

References

External links

1993 births
Brynäs IF players
Färjestad BK players
HV71 players
BIK Karlskoga players
Living people
Luleå HF players
Malmö Redhawks players
Mora IK players
Södertälje SK players
Swedish ice hockey forwards
Växjö Lakers players
Sportspeople from Karlstad